The National Socialist Movement (NSM) is a far-right, Neo-Nazi, white supremacist organization based in the United States. It is a part of the Nationalist Front. The party claimed to be the "largest and most active" National Socialist organization in the United States. It is classified as a hate group by the Southern Poverty Law Center.

In January 2019, the leadership of the group was turned over to James Hart Stern, a Black civil rights activist, who announced his intention to undermine the group and "eradicate" it. In March 2019, in a press release the group's leader, Jeff Schoep, declared that Stern "does not speak for the National Socialist Movement and he holds no legal standing with the NSM". In addition to speaking out against Stern, he also announced that he was leaving the NSM and giving his position to Burt Colucci. Since then, Jeff Schoep has renounced his racist past and he has also renounced his involvement in all racist groups. In April 2021, Colucci was arrested for aggravated assault.

History
The National Socialist Movement was founded in 1974 in St. Paul, Minnesota, as the "National Socialist American Workers Freedom Movement" by Robert Brannen and Cliff Herrington, former members of the American Nazi Party before its decline. In 1994, Jeff Schoep became the group's chairman, a position which he held until January 2019. It was revealed in 2004 that Clifford Herrington, co-chairman of the NSM, was the husband of Andrea Herrington, founder and "high-priestess" of the theistic Satanist organization and website Joy of Satan Ministries, leading to a major debate and conflict both within the NSM itself and Joy of Satan Ministries, and to the Herringtons' eventual departure from the NSM.

The National Socialist Movement was responsible for leading the demonstration which sparked the 2005 Toledo riot. In April 2006, they held a rally on the State Capitol steps in Lansing, Michigan, which was met by a larger counter-rally and ended in scuffles.

In January 2009, the National Socialist Movement sponsored a half-mile section of U.S. Highway 160 outside of Springfield, Missouri, as part of the Adopt-A-Highway Trash Cleanup program. The highway was later renamed the "Rabbi Abraham Joshua Heschel Memorial Highway" by the state legislature.

In 2009, the National Socialist Movement had 61 chapters in 35 states, making it the largest neo-Nazi group in the United States according to the Southern Poverty Law Center. As of 2015, the National Socialist Movement claimed direct organized presences in seven countries around the world, and other affiliations beyond that.

On April 17, 2010, 70 members of the National Socialist Movement demonstrated in front of the Los Angeles City Hall, drawing a counter protest of hundreds of anti-fascist demonstrators.

In May 2011, the National Socialist Movement was described by The New York Times as being "the largest supremacist group, with about 400 members in 32 states, though much of its prominence followed the decay of Aryan Nation and other neo-Nazi groups".

On May 1, 2011, Jeff Hall, a leader of the California branch of the National Socialist Movement, was killed by his 10-year-old emotionally troubled son, who claimed he was tired of Hall beating him and his stepmother. Hall had run in 2010 for a seat on the board of directors of a Riverside County water board, a race in which he earned approximately 30% of the vote.

The National Socialist Movement held a rally on September 3, 2011, in West Allis, Wisconsin, to protest incidents at the Wisconsin State Fair on August 5, 2011, when a large crowd of young African-Americans allegedly targeted and beat white people as they left the fair around 11 p.m. Police claimed that the incident began as a fight among African-American youths that was not racially motivated. Dan Devine, the mayor of West Allis, stated on September 2, 2011, "I believe I speak for the citizens when I say they [the National Socialist Movement] are not welcome here."

In 2012, two former members of the National Socialist Movement were arrested and sentenced to prison for drug trafficking, stockpiling weapons, and plotting terrorist attacks against a Mexican consulate in the United States.

As of March 2015, the organization had planned a return to Toledo, Ohio, for a rally focusing on crime in the area. In June 2016, the group helped organize with the Traditionalist Worker Party the rally which turned into the 2016 Sacramento riot. In November 2016, following the election of Donald Trump, the organization changed its logo, replacing the swastika with an othala rune in an attempt to enter mainstream politics. The account of its leader, Jeff Schoep, was suspended by Twitter on December 18, 2017.

In April 2021, Burt Colucci, still leader of the National Socialist Movement, was arrested in Phoenix, Arizona for aggravated assault on a Black man. Witnesses say he pulled a gun and aimed it at the man, along with hurling threatening remarks, His bail is set at $7,500. Two days before his arrest, he led a group of 15 members of the National Socialist Movement in a rally, although they had expected 100.

Charlottesville suit against the NSM
After the August riot and violence rising from the Unite the Right rally in Charlottesville, Virginia, two lawsuits targeting 21 racist "alt-right" and hate group leaders, including the National Socialist Movement and its leader Jeff Schoep, were filed in the U.S. District Court for the Western District of Virginia and another lawsuit was filed in Virginia Circuit Court. Organizations named in both suits were the National Socialist Movement; the Traditionalist Workers Party (TWP); the League of the South (LOS), and Vanguard America, a two-year-old white supremacy group which claims to have 12 U.S. chapters. Two Ku Klux Klan groups, the Loyal White Knights and the East Coast Knights of the KKK, were named defendants in the federal suit.

The 96 page federal court filing accused the white supremacists of violating the Ku Klux Klan Act of 1871 and other statutes and its plaintiffs seek compensation and punitive damages. It also asked the courts to intervene with legal orders that would prevent a repeat of the deadly events that occurred in Charlottesville on August 11 and 12, 2017, and bar the use of private militias at such events. The plaintiffs who were named in the 96-page federal suit were described as "University of Virginia undergraduates, law students and staff, persons of faith, ministers, parents, doctors, and businesspersons – white, brown and black; Christian and Jewish; young and old". The City of Charlottesville, along with several businesses and neighborhood associations, were plaintiffs in the 81-page state suit.

The federal and state lawsuits both claimed that the August rally in Charlottesville had been planned for weeks, with its organizers making extensive use of social media – coordinating everything from telling individuals to buy tiki torches to making use of an internet-based communications system that was originally designed for gamers. The federal suit claimed that "hundreds of neo-Nazis and white supremacists traveled from near and far to descend upon the college town ... in order to terrorize its residents, commit acts of violence, and use the town as a backdrop to showcase for the media and the nation a neo-nationalist agenda".

While the federal suit focused on prosecuting civil rights violations, the state suit focused on describing and prosecuting violations which it claimed were committed for the illegal purpose of using militia forces to protect alt-right and white nationalist demonstrations.

Change of leadership

On February 28, 2019, the Associated Press reported that, according to Michigan corporate records, Jeff Schoep had been replaced as director and president of the National Socialist Movement in January by James Hart Stern, a Black civil rights activist. Stern became its leader after he received a call for help from Schoep who wanted to get out of the organization due to the legal issues that were mounting against it, and he has said that he wants to use his position to undermine the group. Stern had previously been instrumental in dissolving a chapter of the Ku Klux Klan in Michigan. Stern wrote in a blog post in February that he had worked with Schoep to replace the Nazi swastika as the group's symbol with an othala rune, and that he would be meeting with Schoep to sign a proclamation in which the movement would disavow white supremacy.

In 2014, Stern and Schoep became friends when Schoep called Stern to ask about his connection to Edgar Ray Killen, the head of the Klan chapter that Stern dissolved. According to Stern, Schoep said that Stern was the first black man who he had reached out to since Malcolm X. When Stern learned that Schoep was a white supremacist, he arranged for a meeting between the two men. Since then, they have engaged in debates about the Holocaust, the swastika, White nationalism, and the fate of the National Socialist Movement, with Stern attempting to change Schoep's mind. He was not able to do that, but in 2019, Schoep came to him and asked for his advice with regard to the group's legal problems. He felt that the National Socialist Movement was an "albatross hanging around his neck" and wished to cut ties with the group in order to start a new organization that would be more appreciated in the mainstream of white nationalism. Stern then encouraged Schoep to turn control of the NSM over to him, and Schoep agreed.

Stern filed documents with a Federal court in Virginia, asking that it issue a judgment against the group before one of the pending Charlottesville-related lawsuits went to trial, but because the law does not allow a corporation to be its own attorney, Stern is looking for outside counsel to re-file the papers. Stern did not plan to dissolve the movement, in order to prevent any of its former members from reincorporating it. He planned to turn the group's website into a place for lessons about the Holocaust.

The group's former community outreach director, Matthew Heimbach, commented that Schoep had been in conflict with its membership, which resisted the ideological changes that Schoep wished to make, and wanted to remain "a politically impotent white supremacist gang". Heimbach estimated that the group had 40 dues-paying members as of last year. In a video posted on his blog, Stern took credit for "eradicating" the National Socialist Movement. Burt Colucci is currently the Movement's 'Commander,' a position disputed by many outside of the neo-nazi group.

James Stern died of cancer on October 11, 2019, leaving the future of his plans for the NSM uncertain. Since then, Jeff Schoep has renounced his racist past and he has also renounced his involvement in all racist groups.

See also
Christian Identity
Far-right politics in the United States
Far-right subcultures
Joy of Satan Ministries
List of fascist movements
List of fascist movements by country
List of Ku Klux Klan organizations
List of neo-Nazi organizations
List of organizations designated by the Southern Poverty Law Center as hate groups#Neo-Nazi
List of white nationalist organizations
Neo-Nazi groups in the United States
Racism in the United States
Radical right (United States)
Unite the Right rally
White nationalism#United States
White supremacy#United States

Notes

References

External links

Alt-right organizations
Neo-Nazi political parties in the United States
Political parties established in 1974
Neo-Nazi organizations in the United States
1974 establishments in Minnesota
Anti-Zionism in the United States
Anti-Zionist organizations
Anti-Zionist political parties
Anti-communist parties
White American culture in Michigan
Organisations designated as terrorist by Australia
Organizations designated as terrorist by Canada